Tovin (also Romanized as Ţovīn and Ţovīn; also known as Ţīvīūn and Ţīvyūn) is a village in Garmeh-ye Shomali Rural District, Kandovan District, Meyaneh County, East Azerbaijan Province, Iran. At the 2006 census, its population was 594, in 118 families.

References 

Populated places in Meyaneh County